Oleh Chumak (born 22 May 1970) is a Ukrainian weightlifter. He competed in the men's middle heavyweight event at the 1996 Summer Olympics.

References

External links
 

1970 births
Living people
Ukrainian male weightlifters
Olympic weightlifters of Ukraine
Weightlifters at the 1996 Summer Olympics
Sportspeople from Luhansk